Namito Izawa is a Japanese kickboxer.

Titles and accomplishments

Professional
 2016 Hero Legends -57kg Champion 
 2014 Hero Legends -57kg World Tournament Champion 

Amateur
 2009 K-3 Grand Prix Lightweight Champion
 2008 K-3 Grand Prix Lightweight Champion
 2007 JIKA All Japan Middle School Champion

Fight record

|-  style="background:#fbb;"
| 2020-03-28|| Loss||align=left| Toma || Krush.112 || Tokyo, Japan || TKO (3 Knockdowns/Punches)||1 || 2:48
|-  style="background:#cfc;"
| 2019-09-16|| Win ||align=left| Naoki Takahashi || Krush.105 || Tokyo, Japan || Ext.R Decision (Unanimous) || 4 || 3:00
|-  style="background:#fbb;"
| 2019-04-19|| Loss ||align=left| Tetsuji Noda || Krush 100 || Tokyo, Japan || Decision (Unanimous) || 3 || 3:00
|-  style="background:#cfc;"
| 2019-01-26|| Win ||align=left| Kazumu || Krush 97 || Tokyo, Japan ||  Decision (Unanimous) || 3 || 3:00
|-  style="background:#cfc;"
| 2018-10-28|| Win ||align=left| Takahiro || Krush 94 || Tokyo, Japan ||  KO (Punches & Body knees)|| 3 || 1:23
|-  style="background:#cfc;"
| 2018-06-17 || Win || align=left| Kento Ito || K-1 World GP 2018: Featherweight Championship Tournament || Saitama, Japan || Decision (Unanimous) || 3 || 3:00
|-  style="background:#cfc;"
| 2018-04-22|| Win ||align=left| Shota Kanbe || Krush 87 || Tokyo, Japan ||  Decision (Unanimous) || 3 || 3:00
|-  style="background:#fbb;"
| 2017-09-18|| Loss ||align=left| Yoshiki Takei || K-1 World GP 2017 Welterweight Championship Tournament|| Saitama, Japan || KO (3 Knockdowns/Punches)  || 3 || 1:10
|-  style="background:#cfc;"
| 2017-06-25|| Win||align=left| Li Guangsong || Hero Legends  || Guangdong, China || Ext.R Decision  || 4 || 3:00
|-  style="background:#cfc;"
| 2017-04-22|| Win||align=left| Yuya Suzuki  || K-1 World GP 2017: Super Bantamweight Tournament Reserve Fight || Tokyo, Japan || Ext.R Decision (Split) || 4|| 3:00
|-  style="background:#cfc;"
| 2017-01-15|| Win ||align=left| Rasta || Krush.72 || Tokyo, Japan || Decision (Unanimous) || 3 || 3:00
|-  style="background:#cfc;"
| 2016-10-02|| Win ||align=left| Zhuang Shusong || Hero Legends  || Inner Mongolia, China || Decision (Unanimous) || 3 || 3:00
|-
! style=background:white colspan=9 |
|-  style="background:#cfc;"
| 2016-07-09|| Win||align=left| Wang Xing || Hero Legends || Beijing, China || KO (Low Kick) || 2 ||
|-  style="background:#cfc;"
| 2016-04-10|| Win ||align=left| Kazuyoshi || Krush.65 || Tokyo, Japan || Decision (Majority) || 3 || 3:00
|-  style="background:#fbb;"
| 2015-11-14|| Loss ||align=left| Yuya Suzuki || Krush.60 || Tokyo, Japan || Ext.R Decision (Unanimous) || 4 || 3:00
|-  style="background:#cfc;"
| 2015-09-22|| Win ||align=left| Satoshi Katashima || K-1 World GP 2015 Survival Wars || Tokyo, Japan || Ext.R Decision (Unanimous) || 4 || 3:00
|-  style="background:#fbb;"
| 2015-06-26|| Loss ||align=left| Zhuang Shusong || Hero Legends  || China || Decision (Unanimous) || 3 || 3:00
|-
! style=background:white colspan=9 |
|-  style="background:#CCFFCC;"
| 2015-01-04|| Win ||align=left| Taio Asahisa || Krush.49 || Tokyo, Japan || Ext.R Decision (Unanimous) || 4 || 3:00
|-  style="background:#CCFFCC;"
| 2014-11-09|| Win ||align=left| Toma || Krush.47 || Tokyo, Japan || Ext.R Decision (Unanimous) || 4 || 3:00
|-  style="background:#CCFFCC;"
| 2014-08-24|| Win ||align=left| Shin Isobe || Krush.45 || Nagoya, Japan || KO (Low Kicks)  || 3 || 2:02
|-  style="background:#cfc;"
| 2014-07-13|| Win ||align=left| Ryuji Horio || Krush 43 || Tokyo, Japan || Decision (Majority) || 3 || 3:00
|-  style="background:#cfc;"
| 2014-05-17|| Win ||align=left| Takrudthong Or Unsuwan || Hero Legends -57kg World Tournament, Final  || Guangdong, China || KO || 2 || 2:29
|-
! style=background:white colspan=9 |
|-  style="background:#cfc;"
| 2014-05-17|| Win ||align=left| Zhuang Shusong || Hero Legends -57kg World Tournament, Semi Final  ||Guangdong, China || Decision (Unanimous) || 3 || 3:00
|-  style="background:#cfc;"
| 2014-03-16|| Win ||align=left| Takaaki || Krush-EX 2014 vol.1 || Tokyo, Japan || Decision (Unanimous) || 3 || 3:00
|-  style="background:#fbb;"
| 2013-12-14|| Loss ||align=left| Yuzo Suzuki || Krush 35 || Tokyo, Japan ||Decision (Majority) || 3 || 3:00
|-  style="background:#fbb;"
| 2013-10-13|| Loss ||align=left| Taiga || Krush-IGNITION 2013 vol.6, YOUTH GP 2013 -55kg Tournament Semi Final || Tokyo, Japan ||Ext.R Decision (Split) || 3 || 3:00
|-  style="background:#cfc;"
| 2013-10-13|| Win ||align=left| Ryusei || Krush-IGNITION 2013 vol.6, YOUTH GP 2013 -55kg Tournament Quarter Final || Tokyo, Japan || KO (Low Kick) || 2 || 1:32
|-  style="background:#cfc;"
| 2013-08-11|| Win ||align=left| Kazuki Okawa|| Krush 30 || Tokyo, Japan || KO (Body Punches) || 3 || 2:09
|-  style="background:#fbb;"
| 2013-04-21|| Loss ||align=left| Ryuma Tobe || Krush-IGNITION 2013 vol.3 || Tokyo, Japan || Decision (Unanimous) || 3 || 3:00
|-  style="background:#fbb;"
| 2013-02-24|| Loss ||align=left| Yuko Okada || Bigbang 12 || Tokyo, Japan || Decision (Majority) || 3 || 3:00
|-  style="background:#cfc;"
| 2012-12-14|| Win ||align=left| Tatsuya Hibata || Krush 25 || Tokyo, Japan || Decision (Majority) || 3 || 3:00
|-  style="background:#cfc;"
| 2012-10-08|| Win ||align=left| Yo-hei || Krush-EX 2012 vol.5 || Tokyo, Japan || KO (Low Kick) || 2 || 1:47
|-  style="background:#cfc;"
| 2012-09-09|| Win ||align=left| Yoshiki Nakagawa|| Krush YOUTH GP 2012 -63kg Opening Round || Tokyo, Japan || Decision (Unanimous) || 3 || 3:00
|-  style="background:#fbb;"
| 2012-06-17|| Loss ||align=left| Yuya Suzuki || Krush-EX 2012 vol.3 || Tokyo, Japan || Decision (Unanimous) || 3 || 3:00
|-  style="background:#fbb;"
| 2012-04-22|| Loss ||align=left| Nobuchika Terado || Krush－EX 2012 vol.1 || Tokyo, Japan ||Decision (Unanimous) || 3 || 3:00
|-  style="background:#c5d2ea;"
| 2012-02-17|| Draw ||align=left| Yoshinori Sakuta || Krush 16 || Tokyo, Japan || Decision || 3 || 3:00
|-  style="background:#cfc;"
| 2011-11-12|| Win ||align=left| Ryoji Imai || Krush 13 || Tokyo, Japan || Decision (Unanimous) || 3 || 3:00
|-  style="background:#cfc;"
| 2011-08-14|| Win ||align=left| Kentaro Kimura || Krush 11 || Tokyo, Japan || Ext.R Decision (Unanimous) || 4 || 3:00
|-  style="background:#cfc;"
| 2011-05-29|| Win ||align=left| Sengoku || Krush -70kg Championship Inaugural Tournament || Tokyo, Japan || TKO (Low kicks) || 3 || 1:26
|-  style="background:#cfc;"
| 2011-02-13|| Win ||align=left| TARO || Krush-EX 2011 vol.1 || Tokyo, Japan || Decision (Unanimous) || 3 || 3:00
|-  style="background:#cfc;"
| 2010-07-09|| Win ||align=left| Katsuki Sakaki || Krush 8 || Tokyo, Japan || Decision (Unanimous) || 3 || 3:00
|-  style="background:#c5d2ea;"
| 2010-04-29|| Draw ||align=left| Rikiya Omae || Krush 6 || Tokyo, Japan || Decision || 3 || 3:00
|-  style="background:#cfc;"
| 2010-02-19|| Win ||align=left| Hikari Saenchaigym || Krush-EX～New Generation Fight～ || Tokyo, Japan || KO || 2 || 1:38
|-  style="background:#cfc;"
| 2009-12-09|| Win ||align=left| Masahiro || SURVIVOR～Round.2～ || Tokyo, Japan || Decision (Unanimous) || 3 || 3:00
|-
| colspan=9 | Legend:    

|-  style="background:#fbb;"
| 2009-08-10||Loss||align=left| Shinnosuke Ueda || K-1 Koshien 2009 KING OF UNDER 18 -FINAL16- || Tokyo, Japan || Decision || 3|| 2:00
|-
| colspan=9 | Legend:

References

Living people
1992 births
Japanese male kickboxers